Fulham Football Club is an English professional football team based in Fulham in the London Borough of Hammersmith and Fulham. The club was formed in West Kensington in 1879 as Fulham St Andrew's Church Sunday School F.C., shortened to Fulham F.C. in 1888. They initially played at Fulham Fields before a move to Craven Cottage in 1896; the club played their first professional match in December 1898 and made their FA Cup debut in the 1902–03 season. The club competed in the Southern Football League between 1898 and 1907, when they were accepted into the Football League Second Division. Having spent much of their history outside the top division, the team gained promotion to the Premier League in 2001. They spent more than ten seasons in the top flight, and reached the final of the UEFA Europa League in 2010. In 2014 they were relegated to the Championship. They have since spent one further season back in the Premier League in 2018–19 but suffered an immediate return to the Championship.

Since the club's first competitive match, 966 players have made an appearance in a competitive match, of which 181 have made at least 100 appearances (including substitute appearances); all players who have reached this milestone are listed below. The record number of appearances is held by Johnny Haynes, who played 658 matches in all competitions, scoring 158 goals, in a career spent entirely at Craven Cottage. Eddie Lowe is the only other player to have played more than 500 matches, although Les Barrett came close with 491 appearances. Gordon Davies is the club's record goalscorer, with 179 goals in 450 matches. Five other players have scored more than 100 goals for Fulham. Tom Cairney and Tim Ream are the current squad members who have played over 100 matches for Fulham.

Players
This list contains the 182 players, including six current squad members, as of 30 August 2019, who have made more than 100 appearances for Fulham, ordered by the years in which they played for the club and then alphabetically by surname. The figure for league appearances and goals comprise those in the Southern Football League, the Football League and the Premier League. Total appearances and goals comprise those in the Southern Football League, Football League (including play-offs), Premier League, FA Cup, Football League Cup, Football League Trophy, UEFA Intertoto Cup and UEFA Cup/Europa League. Wartime matches are regarded as unofficial and are excluded, as are matches from the abandoned 1939–40 season. Statistics for the Watney Cup and Anglo-Scottish Cup are not included in the table. International appearances and goals are given for the senior national team only.

Figures are mostly taken from Fulham: The Complete Record by Dennis Turner (published in 2007). UEFA Intertoto Cup and UEFA Cup/Europa League appearance statistics for the 2002–03 and 2009–10 seasons are taken from Soccerbase, along with all other statistics from the 2007–08 season onwards.

Statistics are correct as of 30 August 2019. International statistics correct as of 19 July 2019.

Notes

References
General
 
 
 Fulham at Soccerbase.
 .
 

Specific

External links
Fulham F.C. official website

Players
Players
 
Fulham
Association football player non-biographical articles